Kepler-107 is a star in the constellation Cygnus. It is a spectral type G2 star. The imaging survey in 2016 has failed to find any stellar companions to it.

Planetary system
Kepler-107 has four known planets discovered in 2014. A giant impact is the likely origin of two planets in the system. Kepler-107 c is more than twice as dense (about 12.6 g cm−3) as the innermost exoplanet Kepler-107 b (about 5.3 g  cm−3).

References

117
Cygnus (constellation)
Planetary systems with four confirmed planets
G-type main-sequence stars
Planetary transit variables
J19480677+4812309